The 2004 Erbil bombings was a double suicide attack on the offices of Iraqi Kurdish political parties in Erbil, Kurdistan Region on 1 February 2004. The attackers detonated explosives strapped to their bodies as hundreds gathered to celebrate Eid Al-Adha in Erbil.

A former government minister, the deputy governor of Erbil Governorate and the city's police chief were among those killed at the offices of the Kurdistan Region's main political groups, the Kurdistan Democratic Party (KDP) and the Patriotic Union of Kurdistan (PUK). The attacks occurred as party leaders were receiving hundreds of visitors to mark the start of Eid. 

The Al-Hayat newspaper speculated that the bombings may have been retribution for the capture of bin Laden's courier Hassan Ghul in The Kurdistan Region

"We have no group that's claimed responsibility," Senor said, saying al Qaeda or Ansar al-Islam, a northern Iraq group with suspected al Qaeda ties, could be responsible. "It could be any number of groups attempting to operate inside Iraq."

See also 
 2005 Erbil bombing
 2013 Erbil bombings
 2021 Erbil missile attacks

References

External links 

2004 murders in Iraq
21st-century mass murder in Iraq
Mass murder in 2004
Al-Qaeda activities in Iraq
Suicide bombings in Iraq
Terrorist incidents in Iraq in 2004
February 2004 events in Iraq
Building bombings in Iraq
History of Erbil